The 1984 2. divisjon was a Norway's second-tier football league season.

The league was contested by 24 teams, divided into two groups; A and B. The winners of group A and B were promoted to the 1985 1. divisjon. The second placed teams met the 10th position finisher in the 1. divisjon in a qualification round where the winner was promoted to 1. divisjon. The bottom three teams inn both groups were relegated to the 3. divisjon.

Tables

Group A

Group B

Promotion play-offs

Results
Vidar – HamKam 2–2
Moss – Vidar 4–1
HamKam – Moss 0–0

Moss won the qualification round and remained in the 1. divisjon.

Play-off table

References

Norwegian First Division seasons
1984 in Norwegian football
Norway
Norway